Sidney "Sid" Jenkins is a fictional character in the television series Skins portrayed by Mike Bailey. In the first series, Sid is portrayed as a nice guy stereotype, an unlucky virgin who is nervous around girls, and has low self-esteem. Tony Stonem (his best friend) is his role model, whom he frequently looks up to. However, by the second series, Sid is more dependable and following Tony's accident, becomes more confident in his own skin, leading him to have sexual relationships with both Cassie Ainsworth and Michelle Richardson, as well as standing up for himself more often.

Characterisation
Sid is initially portrayed as a virgin who has a crush on his best friend Tony Stonem's girlfriend, Michelle Richardson, although he later realises that his true feelings are for Cassie Ainsworth. Manipulated by Tony, he is frequently unlucky: losing an expensive amount of cannabis, getting beaten up by Jal Fazer's brothers, and getting urinated on by a dog and a homeless person. He is also at first oblivious to the machinations of his best friend who, aware of Sid's undying adoration of Michelle, exploits it for his amusement. Despite this, he seems, at least in earlier episodes, to idolise Tony, replying to the question 'Is that all you do Sid, hang around with Tony?' with 'pretty much'.

Sid is generally portrayed as a character with good intentions, juxtaposed with Tony's self-serving egotism. He is extremely loyal towards his friends, including Tony and Anwar Kharral, who frequently abuse his loyalty and cause him a great deal of difficulty. Sid's nice guy attitude is quick to win the affections of Cassie, but Sid is oblivious, which leads to him hurting her feelings on numerous occasions. Sid is also very intelligent but underperforms in school because he is easily distracted and lacks direction. When faced with failing his coursework however, Sid is able to write an entire history dissertation in one night. His characterisation is often completed by his choice of clothes, including a bright yellow 'Mega Dog' T-shirt, which includes a button which when pressed produces a 'Mega Dog' catchphrase from a sewn on speaker.

In an interview with Sky, Mike says:

It could be inferred from the meek manner in which Sid accepts the manipulation of Tony, and the anger of his Scottish father Mark, that Sid is weak, and his self-esteem is certainly low. But on the occasions when it is most needed, he shows remarkable strength of character, especially in the episode "Sid". When Sid's father fails to prevent his mother leaving, Sid explodes with anger, and this demonstration of strength improves Sid's relationship with his father in the long run. Also, Sid goes on a 'mission of love' to profess his love to Cassie in the final episode of the first series, and later in the second series where he searches for her in New York City. He shows Cassie's picture in Times Square, but no one recognizes her. This results in his going to her job at a diner, which she told him she works at through postcards. They just miss each other in the window, and it is never shown if Sid turns around to see her, although is implied in Pure that he does.

In the series 2 finale, it is shown that Sid attains a B and two Cs on his A-level finals, even though he didn't apply to university.

Character history

Series 1
In "Tony" he is promised by Tony that Sid will lose his virginity to Cassie before he turns seventeen. He also loses the cannabis for Abigail Stock's party, putting drug dealer Madison Twatter out to find him. Sid pines for Michelle, unaware of Cassie's presence. In "Cassie", Cassie comes to think Sid loves her and is sending her messages saying to eat, but later realises it's all in her head. Madison Twatter becomes a substitute teacher at Sid's school. In "Jal", Madison corners Sid and Jal, smashes the latter's clarinet and steals Sid's credit cards. Jal's brothers, thinking he is the problem, beat up Sid before chasing after Madison and his associate., to which they are hospitalised.

In "Sid", he is grounded by his father Mark and has to cancel the date arranged with Cassie in the previous episode.. When later he is offered by Tony a chance to see Michelle, he takes it. After being beaten up by chav girls, he finds Cassie waiting at his house, upset he had stood her up. She tries to be positive, but is hurt and jealous that Michelle has his love without earning it. After Tony makes Sid believe he can have Michelle, he takes her back before his eyes, affirming his power over them both. Cassie, distraught by Sid's ignorance takes an overdose of pills combined with vodka, and ends up in hospital, accompanied by Jal Fazer, who places the blame squarely on Sid. Later on, it is revealed Sid's mother Liz has moved out due to her husband's behaviour, to which Sid stands up to his father, grounds him and spends the night finishing his History coursework.

In "Maxxie and Anwar", he helps Anwar liberate a girl from what they believe to be her abusive father, although he turns out to be her husband. He also sees a picture of Cassie drawn by Maxxie Oliver, remarking on how beautiful he has made her look. "Michelle" is the episode where Sid realises he really wants Cassie. After a rebounding Michelle attempts to have sex with him, he realises that his love for her is at a level where she can only be his friend. They then both go to find Cassie at her rehab clinic, to tell her. After Sid confesses he likes her, she reveals her new boyfriend, also at the clinic.

In "Effy", Sid is dragged by Tony to help him find his missing sister, Effy Stonem. Eventually, Sid and Tony come to blows, deriding each other's perceived character flaws: Tony sees Sid as wishing to emulate him, whereas Sid sees Tony as something he would never want to become. Later, Sid sees Cassie, agrees to meet with her, and the two finally kiss. Their reunion is cut short by a call from Michelle, which prompts him to try to find Tony and Effy who may be in danger. After he takes Tony and Effy to the hospital, he is the one to defend Tony, who he refers to as his best friend, against his parents' accusations.

Sid spends the beginning of the first series finale wondering about Cassie and attempts to write a letter explaining how much he loves her. Sid hurriedly dresses in mismatching clothes and rushes to Cassie's rehab clinic, just after she leaves in a taxi. In the clinic, the nurse locks Sid in a padded room, deducing that Sid needs their help. Tony comes to his aid and Sid is released from the clinic and the two then look for Cassie. At the end of the episode, it is revealed after Sid left Anwar's party he was meeting with Cassie, who is sitting on a bench overlooking Bristol. He sits besides her, where they then hold hands.

Series 2
In the second series, Sid's relationship with Cassie deteriorates and he begins to distance himself from Tony, who has awakened from his coma and is slowly recovering from the brain damage inflicted by his accident. In "Tony and Maxxie", Sid refuses to visit Tony, who becomes frustrated by the lack of contact from his former best friend. In the "Lost Weeks", web episodes, it is revealed that Sid was the one who attended to Tony in hospital following the accident, reading entire novels out loud to a comatose Tony and even recording messages to help "wake" him up.

Sid also struggles with not being able to see Cassie. Sid reveals that he lost his virginity to Cassie before she moved to Scotland, but there is a lack of contact between them, which Sid resents.

In "Sid", he misinterprets Cassie's closeness with her gay Scottish friend and angrily accuses her of cheating on him, later destroying the laptop he used to communicate with her. In the same episode, a family visit proves too much for Mark to take and he dies, his body discovered by Sid the next morning. Still in shock, Sid goes to school as usual, but finally breaks down in front of Tony while at a concert. The two end up going back to Sid's house together to deal with the situation, which seems to patch up their damaged friendship. At the end of the episode, Sid is seen on a train, presumably headed to Scotland to see Cassie. At the same time, Cassie is seen taking a train in the opposite direction, presumably to visit Sid in Bristol.

In "Michelle", a grieving Sid ends up having sex with his longstanding crush Michelle - who has also given up on Tony - while on a camping trip. Sid and Michelle are soon caught kissing in Sid's bedroom by Cassie, who had returned from Scotland to see Sid.

In "Chris", Cassie angrily confront Sid and Michelle in front of their friends after running into the couple at a club. This also exposes Sid and Michelle's new relationship to Tony, who seems hurt by it. Sid attempts to explain things, but Cassie slaps him, telling him that he can't do whatever he wants even though his father is dead.

In "Tony", Sid goes with Michelle to try to make amends with Tony, but it proves difficult as Tony is hiding under his bed. After coming back from the university interview, Tony finds Sid and Michelle having sex in the toilets of a club, where he tells them he loves them both, and even kisses Sid, saying he loves him even though he's a "useless fucker". Tony also tells Sid that he neither loves nor belongs with Michelle, he belongs with Cassie.

In "Effy", Sid has to do Effy's art coursework in exchange for her "sorting out his fucking soap opera". When he finishes, after describing his emotion as "Hopeless" in her CW, sees pictures of Cassie kissing another boy, which Effy had taken and attached to him. Horrified, Sid goes to Cassie's house and finally confronts her. The two reconcile.

In the series two finale, Sid is told by Chris's dad that the gang can not attend the funeral so he and Tony steal Chris's coffin. They return it when Jal and Michelle demand that they do so. Sid is forgiven by Tony and given a ticket to New York to find Cassie. Tony hugs him and tells him to lose the hat as it "makes you look retarded" and that he always "loved him [Sid] best". He arrives in New York with a photograph of Cassie and eventually walks past the restaurant where she is working. He is turning his head to face the window where he will undoubtedly see her standing when the episode ends.

Post-Series 2
In the first episode of series 3, JJ, Freddie and Cook opened Sid's locker, discovering his beanie, the "Asian Fanny Fun" magazine as well as his name written inside. Cook acknowledges Sid, stating "I don't know who this Sid guy is, but he has a great taste in gash."

All of Sid's possessions in the locker are then set on fire by Cook as part of a dare concocted by Effy.

In the sixth episode of series 5, "Asian Fanny Fun" appears again, a reference to Sid.

In Skins Pure, Cassie returns to London from America. Whether Sid found her in New York or not is not directly confirmed, but Cassie states in a conversation with her roommate that before moving to London she was traveling around America with a boy, but decided to end the relationship because it couldn't go any further. Cassie stated that if the relationship didn't end, it would have lasted forever. Cassie does not give the boy's name, but Skins co-creator Bryan Elsley, who wrote the episode, confirmed that this was intended as a reference to Sid.

References

External links
 Sid Jenkins on the official E4 Skins site
 Sid Jenkins on Myspace

Skins (British TV series) characters
Fictional English people
Fictional English people of Scottish descent
Television characters introduced in 2007
Fictional cannabis users
Teenage characters in television
Male characters in television
British male characters in television